"Smokin" Ed Currie is an American chili pepper breeder who is the founder and president of the PuckerButt Pepper Company. He is best known for breeding the hottest chili pepper in the world, the Carolina Reaper, as recognized by Guinness World Records.

Background 
Currie was born in West Bloomfield Township, Michigan. He graduated from Central Michigan University. In 2001, Currie moved to South Carolina, where he began growing his own peppers in the yard and experimenting with crossbreeds. He was featured in the episode "Chili Eating" in the 2020 Netflix documentary series We Are the Champions.

PuckerButt Pepper Company 
Currie started the PuckerButt Pepper Company in Fort Mill, South Carolina, in 2003. The company has over 500,000 pepper plants and sells peppers considered to be extremely hot. He sells seeds, pepper mash, and hot sauce to more than 95 countries. PuckerButt is the largest organic pepper farm in the US, with annual sales of around $1 million. Currie's hot sauce "The Last Dab" became known when it was featured on the YouTube show Hot Ones.

Currie crossbreeds his pepper plants by taking the pollen of one plant with a paintbrush and then delivering that pollen to a different plant. To create the Carolina Reaper, he took a pepper from Pakistan and combined it with one from Saint Vincent. In 2017, Guinness World Records gave the title of "World's Hottest Chili" to the Carolina Reaper.

References

External links 

 Company website

Living people
Farmers from South Carolina
People from Oakland County, Michigan
Year of birth missing (living people)
Farmers from Michigan
Central Michigan University alumni
Place of birth missing (living people)